Helicocranchia pfefferi, the banded piglet squid, is a small squid of the genus Helicocranchia. Adults of this species are mesopelaegic.

Physical characteristics 
The body consists of a large funnel with small paddle-like fins. They have small tentacles above their eyes. The funnel does not have valves, but contains a  dorsal pad with three papillae as organs. Paddle-shaped fins are attached to a part of the gladius. H. pfefferi has a single ocular photophore and does not have photophores at its arm tips.

Habitat 

As paralarvae (<30 mm ML), they live near the surface of the oceans, between 100 m and 200 m deep. They descend to the mesopelagic zone as they mature, but exhibit a diel vertical migration pattern.

References

Prey 
Its diet resembles that of most squid:  fish, shrimp, and squid.

 Young, R.E. & K.M. Mangold (1922-2003). 2006. Helicocranchia Massy, 1907. Version 16 July 2006 (under construction). In: The Tree of Life Web Project.

External links

 Images of Helicocranchia from the SERPENT Project
 Blog post with much information

Squid
Molluscs described in 1907
Taxa named by Annie Massy